Jeffrey Charles McCarthy (born October 16, 1954) is an American actor and director.

Early life
McCarthy was born in Los Angeles and grew up in Santa Maria, California - growing up blocks away from the Pacific Conservatory of the Performing Arts, where he studied and performed for several seasons in the 1970s. He completed the masters program in acting at the 
American Conservatory Theater in San Francisco before becoming a company member.

Television
McCarthy made over 35 guest star and recurring appearances on television shows such as Elementary, The Good Wife, Madam Secretary, Law & Order: Special Victims Unit, Ed, Designing Women, Cheers, LA Law, Freddy's Nightmares, Matlock, and In the Heat of the Night. McCarthy played the father of Wayne (Freddy Geiger) on the short lived CBS show Love Monkey.

McCarthy played Albert Schweitzer in Albert Schweitzer: Called to Africa (2006), a TV film on PBS.

David Letterman created a running bit for McCarthy who played a politician who, in the middle of primary season, announces on The Late Show that he will run for President of the United States.

Star Trek
He has made guest appearances on two Star Trek series; on Star Trek: The Next Generation, he appeared in the season 3 episode "The Hunted" as Roga Danar, and in the pilot episode of Star Trek: Voyager entitled "Caretaker" as the unnamed chief medical officer  of the USS Voyager.

Michigan J. Frog
McCarthy was chosen by Chuck Jones to be the voice of Michigan J. Frog in his 1995 Another Froggy Evening, a sequel to the original 1955 cartoon One Froggy Evening. McCarthy went on to voice Michigan J. Frog, "spokesphibian" for the WB Television Network.

Film
McCarthy has played various roles in films including Starting Out In the Evening with Frank Langella, Consent opposite Kate Burton, RoboCop 2 playing Holtzgang, the lawyer representing the company that built Robocop, Eve of Destruction, Rapid Fire and Cliffhanger.

RoboCop 2 (1990) - Holzgang
Eve of Destruction (1991) - Young Bill Simmons 
Rapid Fire (1992) - Agent Anderson 
Cliffhanger (1993) - Pilot 
Starting Out in the Evening (2007) - Charles
Consent (2010) - Mark

Directing
He has directed stage and film productions, including:

Danny And The Deep Blue Sea for the 29th St Project, NYC, The Glass Menagerie for the University of New Hampshire and Urinetown for the University of Oklahoma. Working with his brother, Jim McCarthy in 2016, he wrote, directed and edited Keepsake, a short film featuring his daughter, the actress Juliet Perrell McCarthy.

Theatre
In 1983, he debuted on Broadway, playing opposite Anthony Quinn in Zorba.  McCarthy played Bob Freelander in Marvin Hamlisch and Howard Ashman's ill-fated Smile, which opened on Broadway in November 1986. He played Terry in the original Broadway cast of Side Show in 1997, recorded for Sony Music. He is perhaps best known in the theater for his creation of Officer Lockstock in the Broadway production of Urinetown, which opened on Broadway in September 2001. From 1995 - 97, McCarthy played the "Beast" in the Broadway production of Beauty and the Beast . He later returned to the role for a limited engagement lasting from February through April 2004. He also played King Triton in a workshop for Disney's stage adaptation of The Little Mermaid. McCarthy played Dubhdara in the musical The Pirate Queen which opened on Broadway in April 2007. In 2008, 2009 and 2011, McCarthy played Billy Flynn in Chicago, the long-running Broadway revival. McCarthy created the role of Lola Cola in the premiere of the bluegrass musical, Southern Comfort which opened at the Off-Broadway Public Theater in March 2016.

In February 2017 at the Off-Broadway 59E59 Theaters, McCarthy created the title character in Jeffrey Sweet's Kunstler about the radical civil rights attorney, William Kunstler." By popular demand, he went on to play the role in the Barrington Stage Company (Pittfield, Massachusetts) production, which opened in May 2017. (McCarthy is an associate artist at the Barrington Stage Company.)

In 2012, McCarthy played the title role in the stage version of How the Grinch Stole Christmas! at Madison Square Garden.

McCarthy has worked extensively in regional theater playing leading roles at The Guthrie, Long Wharf Theater, Arena Stage, Barrington Stage, ACT San Francisco, Denver Center Theater and others.

References

External links

American male film actors
American male musical theatre actors
People from Los Angeles
American male television actors
Living people
1954 births